After the Austro-Prussian War the North German Confederation was established in 1866 with the United States recognizing the Confederation in 1867. Formal diplomatic relations were never established. Four years later the Confederation later merged with the German Empire where relations continued.

History
Following the establishment of the North German Confederation on July 1, 1867, on November 20, 1867, the U.S. Minister to Prussia, George Bancroft, informed Secretary of State William H. Seward that he had attended the opening of the North German Parliament. He requested, however, that the Secretary formally notify him of the intentions of the U.S. Government concerning the question of the recognition of the North German Confederation. On December 9, 1867, Secretary Seward approved of Bancroft's decision to attend the opening of the North German Parliament since he was the officially-accredited U.S. Minister to the Prussian King Wilhelm I, who was also the hereditary President of the North German Confederation. Furthermore, Seward informed Bancroft that he would disseminate a description of the Confederation's flag so that its ships would be welcomed in American waters. This exchange between Seward and Bancroft implicitly signified a formal recognition of the North German Confederation by the United States.

The U.S. sent George Bancroft to serve as Minister of the North German Confederation, in addition to Bancroft’s 1867 commission as U.S. Minister to Prussia. On February 22, 1868, Bancroft concluded the Naturalization Convention with the North German Union to "regulate the citizenship of those persons who emigrate from the North German Confederation to the United States of America, and from the United States of America to the territory of the North German Confederation."

When the North German Union was abolished by the creation of the German Empire in 1871, the United States recognized the legitimacy of and established diplomatic relations with the German Empire. At this point the North German Union was defunct.

See also

 Foreign relations of the United States
 Germany–United States relations
 Grand Duchy of Baden–United States relations
 Kingdom of Bavaria–United States relations
 Duchy of Brunswick-Lüneburg–United States relations
 Kingdom of Hanover–United States relations
 German Empire–United States relations
 Hanseatic Republics–United States relations
 Grand Duchy of Hesse–United States relations
 Grand Duchy of Mecklenburg-Schwerin–United States relations
 Grand Duchy of Mecklenburg-Strelitz–United States relations
 Duchy of Nassau–United States relations
 Grand Duchy of Oldenburg–United States relations
 Principality of Schaumburg-Lippe–United States relations
 Kingdom of Württemberg–United States relations

References

Further reading

United States
Bilateral relations of the United States
Germany–United States relations